Superman's father may refer to:
Jor-El, Superman's biological father on Krypton
Jonathan Kent, Superman's adoptive father on Earth